This is a list of places on the Victorian Heritage Register in Alpine Shire in Victoria, Australia. The Victorian Heritage Register is maintained by the Heritage Council of Victoria.

The Victorian Heritage Register, as of 2021, lists the following fifteen state-registered places within Alpine Shire:

References 

Alpine
+
+